Samuel Riot, known professionally as Wildlife!, is a Swiss music producer and musician.

Career

 On March 5, 2013, Wildlife!'s "Klouds" was released as part of the "Mixpak Pressure Vol. 2" compilation on Dre Skull's Mixpak Records imprint. The track was premiered on the Spin magazine website on February 17.
 On October 28, 2014, Wildlife! and British producer Murlo's collaborative production "Control" was released as part of the "Pak Man" compilation, a joint venture release of Brooklyn based label Mixpak Records and Berlin based imprint Man Recordings.
 On March 31, 2015, Wildlife! released his "Fever Pitch" white label via Brooklyn based imprint Mixpak Records. It premiered on Fact (UK magazine) on March 24.
 On May 13, 2016, Wildlife! released "Patterns", his official debut EP for Mixpak Records. The EP was translated into an immersive sound installation, which debuted at SIGNAL Gallery in Brooklyn on May 14, 2016.
 On July 14, 2017, Wildlife! released "Anima", his second EP for Mixpak Records. The EP was presented with an accompanying sound installation at Studio 301 on July 15, 2017 in Brooklyn, NY.
 On July 12, 2019, Wildlife! released "Ballads", his third EP for Mixpak Records.

Discography

EPs

 Ballads (Mixpak Records, 2019)
 Anima (Mixpak Records, 2017)
 Patterns (Mixpak Records, 2016)
 Fever Pitch (Mixpak Records, 2015)

Singles

 Murlo & Wildlife! - Control (Mixpak Records/Man Recordings, 2014)
 Wildlife! - Klouds (Mixpak Records, 2013)

Production discography

References

External links
 Official website WILDLIFE!

21st-century Swiss musicians
1980 births
Living people